Polis Egaleo Rugby (City Egaleo) is a Greek rugby club in Egaleo.

External links
Polis Egaleo Rugby

Greek rugby union teams